The Razor Scooter is a compact folding scooter developed by Micro Mobility Systems and manufactured by JD Corporation. Over 5 million units were sold in the six months following the launch of the first Razor scooter in 2000, and it was named as Toy of the Year that same year. The first electric Razor scooter was released in 2003. Today, the Razor is manufactured by RazorUSA, based in Cerritos, California, in the United States.

Design
The basic scooter design consists of an airplane grade aluminum frame, 98 mm polyurethane wheels, and a hinged fender over the rear wheel, which is pushed down by the foot to act as a spoon brake.  The handlebar and headtube fold for carriage when a quick release latch is opened.

Models 

A - 98mm wheels
S - "A" with fixed-height handle bars (no height adjustment)
AW - "A" with a wheelie bar
Spark - "A" with a spark bar for real spark action from the rear brake
A2 - "A" with a front suspension and a wheelie bar
A3 - extended A2, early versions have 98mm wheels and later ones have 125mm wheels
AW125 - extended A3 with 125mm wheels, upgrade to the early versions of the A3
A5 Lux - 200mm wheels
Non-Pro Model - the non-stunt model
Ultra Pro - for stunts, not foldable
Cruiser - 140mm wheels
Malibu Cruiser - cruiser but with 125mm wheels and a metal deck
Finger Crusher - lightweight design, Dan Green Pro Model

Electric scooters 

In 2003, RazorUSA introduced its first electric Razor scooter. It operates with the use of a twisting throttle. These new models reach speeds up to 15 miles per hour. Electric scooters became a popular way to travel slightly longer distances than one might with a traditional Razor scooter, yet distances short enough that using a bike would be excessive.

Freestyle riding

Freestyle scootering is a growing sport. Due to the rough demands of trick riding, people often reinforce the scooter to withstand impacts and high force.

Safety 
Razor scooters have received attention for the frequency of injuries sustained by riders. In 2014, The Atlantic and other news outlets reported that Razor and other brands of scooters contributed to substantial increases in yearly numbers of emergency room visits.

Razor claims their scooters are safe to ride, and recommends adult supervision and the use of protective gear when riding. To increase the safety of younger riders, razor recommends a three wheeled scooter.

Team Razor 
Team Razor is an exhibition scooter team sponsored by Razor. This team of professionals travels across the U.S., wowing crowds with their tricks and talents, and appeared at X Games Los Angeles 2013. In October 2013 they completed the Team Razor Cross Country Tour, visiting 17 states as well as the District of Columbia. The team held their most recent exhibition event on August 30, 2014 at the 3rd Annual Triple Crown.

Current roster

References

External links

 

Kick scooters
2000s fads and trends
2000 introductions